Dino Time (known as Back to the Jurassic in the US) is a 2012 South Korean computer-animated fantasy comedy adventure film produced by CJ Entertainment and distributed by Clarius Entertainment. The film was released on November 30, 2012 in South Korea.

The English dub was released on June 2, 2015 with the English dub voices led by Melanie Griffith, Jane Lynch, William Baldwin, Stephen Baldwin, and Rob Schneider.

Plot

Ernie Fitzpatrick (Pamela Adlon) is a daredevil kid who lives in Terra Dino with his best friend Max Santiago (Yuri Lowenthal) and his sister Julia (Tara Strong) who likes to tattle on him. Ernie and Julia live with their overprotective mother Sue (Jane Lynch), who has been chosen as the mother of the year. Ernie is told to go to the store after school to keep an eye on it, but he disobeys orders and goes with Max to the Terra Dino Museum to sneak into a forbidden area still under construction to see the bones of the ferocious Sarcosuchus. Julia follows them there and uses a quarter that Ernie gave her to set off the alarm. Julia is able to escape while Ernie and Max get caught by the guards, and Sue grounds Ernie for three weeks. Ernie disobeys orders once more by sneaking out of the house.

Ernie goes to Max's house to see if his father Dr. Santiago (Fred Tatasciore) has had any success with activating a time machine he built four years ago. While Ernie and Max admire the time machine, Julia, who followed Ernie, reveals herself and attempts to call Sue. When Ernie and Max try to stop her, the former ends up spilling soda on the time machine's control panel, activating it and sending the kids back in time 65 million years ago, to the time of the dinosaurs.

Upon exiting the time machine, the kids meet a friendly Tyrannosaurus named Tyra (Melanie Griffith) who runs an orphanage for dinosaurs without parents. Among the orphans is a hyperactive dinosaur (Rob Schneider) who quickly befriends the kids. Tyra decides to take the kids in as her own, but the other dinosaurs do not think that the kids can protect them from the evil Sarcosuchus Brothers, Sarco (William Baldwin) and Surly (Stephen Baldwin). The brothers reside in the lower valley, and because their lair is sinking into the tar pits ever so slowly, they plan to kill Tyra so they can move into and take over the upper valley. The brothers' three bird henchmen Morris (Nolan North), Borace (Tom Kenny) and Horace (John DiMaggio) find out about Tyra's "newborn babies", and because they mistake the time machine for a real egg, the brothers decide to have their henchmen steal it so they can lure Tyra to their lair and kill her. Back in the present, Sue and Dr. Santiago discover their kids' disappearances and learn that Tyra's real egg has switched places with the time machine.

Ernie, wanting to explore the environment before they leave, hides the power key of the time machine in his pocket and tells a lie that it's missing. The kids sneak away from Tyra early in the morning to "look" for the power key, but they run into the hyperactive dinosaur from earlier who accidentally causes them to fall into a river. Because the dinosaur helps the kids dodge several boulders scattered throughout the river, they decide to name him Dodger. Unbeknownst to Ernie, however, the power key falls out of his pocket while he's in the river, and it is found by Horace who swallows it. After Tyra takes everyone back to her nest, the kids and Dodger decide to have some fun while Ernie is busy looking for the power key. At the same time, Sue and Dr. Santiago start building their own time machine out of Sue's car.

The next day, the group spot tracks from Morris and his gang and follow them, but it turns out to be a trick so that the henchmen can steal the time machine. As they are leaving, however, Horace spits out the power key. When the group return to the nest, Ernie finds the power key and reveals his earlier deception, angering Julia and Max. The kids become horrified to find the time machine gone and start to worry that they're trapped in the prehistoric era until Ernie gets the idea to make a landmark containing instructions to activating the time machine. By writing it on a place that's still in the present time, their parents will see it and discover how to find them. The kids decide to write the landmark on Mystery Rock, the center of Terra Dino, but before they can do so, Julia is captured by Morris and his gang to lure Tyra to the lower valley since stealing the time machine didn't work. Once the kids and Tyra reach the Sarco Brothers' lair, Tyra fights the brothers and knocks them unconscious. The kids and Tyra then attempt to escape, but Ernie gets separated from the group when Morris and his gang start chasing him. Before the henchmen can eat him, however, Dodger plays a trick on them, scaring the henchmen and causing them to fall into a tar pit.

Meanwhile, Tyra's real egg hatches in Dr. Santiago's house, and the newborn escapes and starts causing mayhem. Sue and Dr. Santiago are able to capture it with hamburgers from the Burgersaurus restaurant, but they still fail to activate the time machine. Upon seeing a landmark on Mystery Rock, however, Sue realizes that spilling soda on the controls activates the time machine. Back in the lower valley, the kids run into the Sarco Brothers again after they regain consciousness. Knowing Tyra will die fighting the brothers alone, the kids forgo their chance to return home so they can help her, resulting in the time machine sinking into a tar pit. After having Julia blind Surly, Ernie throws his rocket-powered skateboard into his mouth and activates it, causing the ignition from the skateboard to blast Surly into the lava and kill him. Sarco goes for another attack but is stopped by Tyra, who is badly weakened. When Sue and Dr. Santiago arrive in the lower valley, Tyra regains her strength and kills Sarco by pushing him into a tar pit. Sue initially thinks that Tyra is an enemy, but once the kids clear up the misunderstanding, they all leave the lower valley together and return to the upper valley. Before the humans return to the present time, Dr. Santiago reunites Tyra with her real baby.

As the humans head back home, Ernie reveals to Sue that he did not write the landmark because he went to save Julia. They soon learn that Dodger is the one who did it when they see him in the time machine with them.

Cast
 Pamela Adlon as Ernie Fitzpatrick
 Tara Strong as Julia "Jules" Fitzpatrick
 Jane Lynch as Sue Fitzpatrick
 Yuri Lowenthal as Max Santiago
 Fred Tatasciore as Dr. Santiago
 Melanie Griffith as Tyra the Tyrannosaurus
 Stephen Baldwin as Surly the Sarcosuchus
 William Baldwin as Sarco the Sarcosuchus
 Rob Schneider as Dodger
 Dee Bradley Baker as Dinosaur Vocal Effects
 Grey DeLisle as Baby Tyrannosaurus
 John DiMaggio as Horace, Big Guard
 Tom Kenny as Borace, Burger Attendant, Guard #2, Tour Guide
 Nolan North as Morris, Guard #3

Additional voices by Melanie Abramoff, Jessica DiCicco, Benjamin Diskin, Dawnn Lewis, Megan Lovegren, Mary Elizabeth McGlynn, Jamie Simone, Roger Craig Smith, and Kari Wahlgren.

Crew
 Jack Fletcher - Voice Director
 Lee Mi-kyung (Miky Lee) - Executive Producer
 Jeong Tae-sung - Co-Executive Producer
 Woo Kyung Jung - Investment & Finance Producer
 Seong-hie Ryu - Production Designer
 Yeong-wook Jo - Music by
 Sang-gyeong Jo - Costume Designer 
 Jeon Hyoung Lee - Visual Effects Supervisor 
 Jin Lee - Cinematography
 Jin Lee - Editing
 Jong-hee Song - Make-up & Hair Designer
 Jung Gun - Sound Mixer
 Eun-ah Choi - Supervising Dialogue Editor

Release
The film was released in 2012 in South Korea, Poland, Israel, Turkey and the US, on 2013 in Russia, South Africa, Estonia, Kuwait, Bahrain, Lithuania, Italy, New Zealand and Mexico and on 2014 in Peru, Germany, Chile and Argentina. The film was slated to have a limited theatrical release beginning on December 7, 2012 in the United States, but was pulled at the last minute. A trailer was released on October 30, 2012, paired with screenings of Hotel Transylvania. This film was rated PG by the MPAA for "some scary action and mild rude humor". It was released in Australia on August 3, 2013. It finally saw an American release on June 2, 2015 under the title Back to the Jurassic only 10 days before the hugely successful Jurassic World film.

DVD release
The film was released on DVD, Blu-ray and Blu-ray 3D in the United States on June 2, 2015 as Back to the Jurassic.

References

External links
 
 
 
 

2012 films
2012 computer-animated films
2010s children's fantasy films
South Korean animated films
CJ Entertainment films
Animated films about time travel
Animated films about dinosaurs
2010s American animated films
2010s English-language films
2010s South Korean films